Twinfilin-2 is a protein that in humans is encoded by the TWF2 gene.

The protein encoded by this gene was identified by its interaction with the catalytic domain of protein kinase C-zeta. The encoded protein contains an actin-binding site and an ATP-binding site. It is most closely related to twinfilin (PTK9), a conserved actin monomer-binding protein.

References

Further reading